Pionnier means pioneer in French. It may also refer to:

 Foreign Legion Pioneers (Pionniers), a French military unit
 Laurent Pionnier, a French footballer
 Les Pionniers, a nickname for Pau FC, a football club in France
 Pionniers de Chamonix-Mont Blanc, an ice hockey team in France

See also 

 École des Pionniers (disambiguation)